Boltonia montana, the mountain doll's daisy,  is a North American species of plants in the family Asteraceae. It is found only in the east-central part of the United States, in the states of New Jersey, Pennsylvania, and Virginia.

Boltonia montana is a perennial herb up to 150 cm (60 inches) tall. It has many daisy-like flower heads with pink or lavender ray florets and yellow disc florets.

References

Astereae
Flora of the Eastern United States
Plants described in 2006